Robert Gentry (September 29, 1940 – September 17, 2022) was an American actor who was known for his work on several daytime soap operas. 

Gentry was born in New York City on September 29, 1940. He was one of the actors to play the role of Ed Bauer on Guiding Light. He initially portrayed Ed from 1966 to 1969, and left the role to appear on a new ABC soap opera, The Best of Everything.. Gentry returned nearly 30 years later to play the role of Ed on a recurring basis from 1997 to 1998. 

Gentry played two characters on Another World.  From 1979 to 1981, he played the character of the opportunistic Philip Lyons, then returned in 1997–98 to play the role of Detective Craig Morris.  In 1983, he had the short-term role of Giles Morgan on One Life to Live. 

His longest tenure, however, was on All My Children, where he played the part of Ross Chandler for seven years (1983–1990). As the nephew of powerful Adam Chandler, Ross was revealed to be the illegitimate son of Palmer Cortlandt. In 1990, on Generations, he played the role of villain Jordan Hale 

Gentry also played the part of Richard Hunt on Days of Our Lives from 1994 to 1995, as well as several other shorter roles on other serials, including The Bold & The Beautiful where he played Elliot, the Forrester family attorney. 

Gentry has also turned up periodically as a guest on a number of primetime series. In the early-1970s he co-starred with Agnes Moorehead in the film Dear Dead Delilah.

Gentry died on September 17, 2022, at the age of 81.

Recognition
In 1988, Gentry was nominated for an Emmy Award for Outstanding Lead Actor in a Drama Series for his All My Children role.

References

External links

1940 births
2022 deaths
American male soap opera actors